Plasminogen activator inhibitor 1 RNA-binding protein (serbp1) is a protein that in humans is encoded by the SERBP1 gene.

Interactions
SERBP1 has been shown to interact with CHD3.

References

Further reading

External links